Mr. & Mrs. Smith is an American crime drama television series that aired on CBS. Starring Scott Bakula and Maria Bello, the series aired from September 20, 1996 to November 8, 1996. Mr. & Mrs. Smith was set and filmed in Seattle. The series was produced by Page Two Productions and Bakula Productions in association with Warner Bros. Television.

Synopsis
A spy known only as Mr. Smith (Bakula) works for a private security organization known as "The Factory". Using covert operatives and the latest technology they gather information on technology, science, and economics in an effort to protect corporate America from espionage. They are also hired out as private security or to help with covert operations like the recovery of stolen Stinger missiles. In the pilot, a rival named Mrs. Smith (Bello) becomes entangled on a case with Mr. Smith. After losing her job when her mission fails, The Factory hires her and assigns them to work together. Though they often bicker, and know nothing about each other's personal lives, including real names, they make a good team.

The series was canceled after nine of the thirteen episodes produced were aired. The remaining four episodes aired in Norway, Poland, Finland, Australia, the Netherlands, and Germany.

Cast
 Scott Bakula as Mr. Smith
 Maria Bello as Mrs. Smith
 Roy Dotrice as Mr. Big

Production
Mr. & Mrs. Smith was executive produced by Kerry Lenhart and John J. Sakmar. Series star Scott Bakula served as one of the series' producers.

The pilot episode marked the acting debut of Timothy Olyphant, who played Mr. Smith's original partner.

Episodes

References

External links
 
 

1996 American television series debuts
1996 American television series endings
1990s American crime drama television series
CBS original programming
English-language television shows
Espionage television series
Television shows set in Seattle
Television series by Warner Bros. Television Studios